413th may refer to:

413th Fighter-Interceptor Squadron, inactive United States Air Force unit
413th Flight Test Group, United States Air Force Air Force Reserve Command unit
413th Flight Test Squadron (413 FLTS), part of the 46th Test Wing, based at Hurlburt Field, Florida

See also
413 (number)
413, the year 413 (CDXIII) of the Julian calendar
413 BC